The Cathedral of Our Lady is a Roman Catholic cathedral in Antwerp, Belgium. Today's see of the Diocese of Antwerp started in 1352 and, although the first stage of construction was ended in 1521, has never been 'completed'. In Gothic style, its architects were Jan and Pieter Appelmans. It contains a number of significant works by the Baroque painter Peter Paul Rubens, as well as paintings by artists such as Otto van Veen, Jacob de Backer and Marten de Vos.

The belfry of the cathedral is included in the Belfries of Belgium and France entry in the list of UNESCO World Heritage Sites.

History

Before 1124
The first Christian missionaries arrived in the 7th century. The first parish church dedicated to Saint Peter and Saint Paul was constructed in the current Sint Michielsstraat. After the Viking raids in 836, the church was damaged and restored, and subsequently dedicated to Saint Michael. In the 10th century, a group of 12 secular canons were connected to this church. They would dedicate all of their time to the Liturgy of the Hours, and mainly opposed the beliefs of the established Roman Catholic Church. Upon hearing of their dissent behavior, the bishop of the Roman Catholic Archdiocese of Cambrai (to which Antwerp belonged at the time) then sent Norbert of Xanten to discipline them. In 1124, Norbert of Xanten convinces 4 of the secular canons to start a norbertine abbey and thus the parish church becomes a monastery church, known as St. Michael's Abbey. The 8 other secular canons prefer to keep their freedom and move to a different location, a chapel dedicated to Our Lady, the Virgin Mary.

This chapel becomes Antwerp's new parish church, and is located between the Saint Michael residential area, and an older settlement around the area of Het Steen.

Our Lady's church
Becoming more popular, the chapel is demolished and replaced by a much bigger romanesque church. The three-aisled nave corresponded in width to the cathedral's current central aisle, the inner and partly the middle aisles. The cloverleaf-shaped eastern section with a full aisle had a width of no less than 42 m. In 1294, the church gets a novum opus extension, indicating the first signs of gothic architecture.

Our Lady's cathedral and damage

  
In 1352, construction was begun on a new Our Lady's church which would become the largest Gothic church in Belgium. In the beginning, it was to be provided with two towers of equal height. In 1521, after nearly 170 years, the new church of Our Lady was ready. The south tower reached only as far as the third-string course.

During the night of 5–6 October 1533, the new church was largely gutted by fire, however Lancelot II of Ursel managed to save the building. The completion of the second tower was therefore delayed, which led to its ultimate postponement. Moreover, the church only became the cathedral of the bishopric of Antwerp in 1559 but lost this title again from 1801 to 1961, following the Concordat of 1801. During the Iconoclasm of 20 August 1566 (part of the Beeldenstorm at the start of the Eighty Years' War), Protestants destroyed a large part of the cathedral interior. The eye-witness Richard Clough, a Welsh Protestant merchant then in Antwerp, wrote that the cathedral: "looked like a hell, with above 10,000 torches burning, and such a noise as if heaven and earth had got together, with falling of images and beating down of costly works, such sort that the spoil was so great that a man could not well pass through the church. So that in fine [short], I cannot write you in x sheets of paper the strange sight I saw there, organs and all destroyed."

Nicolas Sander, an English Catholic exile who was a professor of theology at Louvain, described the destruction in the church:
... these fresh followers of this new preaching threw down the graven [sculpted] and defaced the painted images, not only of Our Lady but of all others in the town. They tore the curtains, dashed in pieces the carved work of brass and stone, brake the altars, spoilt the clothes and corporesses, wrested the irons, conveyed away or brake the chalices and vestiments, pulled up the brass of the gravestones, not sparing the glass and seats which were made about the pillars of the church for men to sit in. ... the Blessed Sacrament of the altar ... they trod under their feet and (horrible it is to say!) shed their stinking piss upon it ... these false bretheren burned and rent not only all kind of Church books, but, moreover, destroyed whole libraries of books of all sciences and tongues, yea the Holy Scriptures and the ancient fathers, and tore in pieces the maps and charts of the descriptions of countries.

Later, when Antwerp came under Protestant administration in 1581, a number of artistic treasures were once again destroyed, removed or sold. The restoration of Roman Catholic authority came in 1585 with the fall of Antwerp.

In 1794 the French revolutionaries who conquered the region plundered Our Lady's Cathedral and inflicted serious damage. Around 1798, the French administration intended to demolish the building but after each blow, the cathedral was able to recover. In 1816, various important works of art were returned from Paris, including three Rubens masterpieces. Over the course of the 19th century, the church was completely restored and refurnished.

Between 1965 and 1993, a complete restoration took place.

Musical life
At the beginning of the 15th century, the cathedral's choir started developing an active musical life, and as a result, the cathedral's importance in the history of music soon soared. Johannes Ockeghem, one of the most important composers of the 15th century, served here as a vicar-singer in 1443, and so did Jacob Obrecht between 1492 and 1497. Sixteenth-century choirmasters included Antoine Barbe, Geert van Turnhout, Séverin Cornet, and Andreas Pevernage. Organists who worked at the cathedral include Henry Bredemers (1493–1501), who went on to become a teacher to Philip the Handsome's children and the renowned English composer John Bull (1615–1628), who fled to Flanders from his home country escaping justice. From 1725 to 1731 Willem de Fesch served as Kapelmeester, followed from 1731 to 1737 by Joseph-Hector Fiocco, and from 1737 by André-Joseph Blavier. Lesser known but locally important figures, such as Jacobus Barbireau and Andreas Pevernage, also worked at the cathedral.

Significant architectural details
Charles V, Holy Roman Emperor commented that the spire should be kept under glass, and Napoleon compared the spire to Mechlin lace. The largest bell in the tower requires 16 bell ringers.

The west portal features statues which include the missionary Saint Willibrord. He is thought to have spent time in Antwerp in the 7th century.

Major works of art

The cathedral possesses a number of major works of art :
 The effigy from the Tomb of Isabella of Bourbon
 The Raising of the Cross – Peter Paul Rubens
 Assumption of the Virgin Mary – Peter Paul Rubens
 The Descent from the Cross – Peter Paul Rubens

Two of these artworks were confiscated by Napoleon and moved to France, The Raising of the Cross (which was actually the main altar piece of the St Walburga church) and The Descent from the Cross, but were returned to the cathedral in the 19th century.

Burials
Inside the Cathedral some important graves still can be found, amongst them family members of the noble houses of Rubens, Fourment, Goubau, Tucher, Plantin, Moretus, de Borrekens, etc. Some stones were resited there after Saint-Michael's abbey church was lost.

Facts and figures

Gallery

See also
 List of carillons in Belgium
 List of tallest structures built before the 20th century

Notes

References

External links

 De Kathedraal – official website
 Cathedral of Our Lady, Visit Antwerpen
 Antwerp Cathedral at Sacred Destinations
 Organs in the Antwerp Cathedral
 Towers of the Cathedral
 University of Michigan Library Lantern Slide Collection
 

1521 establishments in the Holy Roman Empire
16th-century Roman Catholic church buildings in Belgium
Bell towers in Belgium
Carillons
Gothic architecture in Belgium
Roman Catholic cathedrals in Belgium
Roman Catholic churches completed in 1521
Roman Catholic churches in Antwerp